ClayFighter 63⅓ is a 1997 fighting game developed and published by Interplay Productions for the Nintendo 64. It is the third installment of the ClayFighter series. The title is a parody of the "64" suffix common with the Nintendo 64's games.

Upon release, ClayFighter 63⅓ was negatively received by critics for its gameplay, animation, and AI. An updated version entitled ClayFighter: Sculptor's Cut was released in 1998 as a Blockbuster rental exclusive. Due to not receiving wide distribution, Sculptor's Cut is one of the rarest and most valuable Nintendo 64 games.

Gameplay
Like its predecessors, ClayFighter and ClayFighter 2: Judgment Clay, Clayfighter 63⅓ uses stop motion animation and claymation as opposed to traditional computer animation to produce a unique effect.

The arenas in ClayFighter 63⅓ are unique in that each one, with several exceptions, houses multiple rooms; during fights players can punch or kick their opponents into different rooms and the fight will then continue in that room. There are 26 different rooms to fight in.

The game itself parodies other fighting games. It uses a 3-level bar for super combos like in the Street Fighter Alpha series and uses parries like the Street Fighter III series, and many of the super attacks are noticeably variations of attacks from the Street Fighter series. It also features a combo system similar to Killer Instinct, although it makes fun of the combo names (for example, "Itty Bitty Combo", or "Triple Brown Betty Combo"). During battle players can use many different attacks which have their own strengths and weaknesses.

Plot
The Isle of Klaymodo is the resting place of "Bessie", the purple meteor that came crashing out of the sky onto Klaymodo Island. Bessie has the essential ingredient, Bawk Choy, necessary for Dr. Kiln's world-dominating Mutagen. Klaymodo's chief baddies are the devious Dr. Kiln and local voodist Happy Harry Houngan.

With a combination of laboratory experiments and voodoo spells, they've created an "interesting" assortment of hooligans to help them take over the world. These hideous henchmen include Bonker, a clown gone bad, and Ickybod Clay, the wonder from down under.
Dr. Kiln is putting on the finishing touches on his top secret mutagen code named "Clayotic Claymorphisis" as Houngan walks through the lab door. When Houngan finds out about Dr. Kiln's secret formula the clay hits the fan. As the fight breaks loose the vial containing the mutagen breaks in Dr. Kiln's hand and begins to take on a life of its own.

The condition begins to spread rapidly and Dr. Kiln has no choice but to amputate his own hand. As the hand hits the floor it scurries out of the lab and into the dense jungle of Klaymodo. Houngan quickly exits the lab in pursuit of the Hand as Dr. Kiln writhes in pain.
Meanwhile, as Dr. Kiln deals with his newfound stump, a ship on a 3-hour tour capsizes just off of Rubbage Reef. The ship contains a lively crew of characters, each with their own agendas. There's Bad Mister Frosty®, a one time bad guy who's turned his life around and Kung Pow, a Wok cookery Chef Boy R' Clay. Taffyman and Blob round out the castaways of the SS Manure.

Characters
There are twelve characters in ClayFighter 63⅓, six from previous games in the ClayFighter series, four debuting in this game, and two from other game series. The first nine are available for play immediately, and the latter three are hidden characters (shown below) that can be unlocked with cheat codes or to finish the game with each character. All twelve characters from ClayFighter 63⅓ appeared in the updated version of the game, ClayFighter: Sculptor's Cut, along with four new characters, increasing the total character roster to sixteen.

Default characters
Bad Mr. Frosty The Fighting Snowman

Once again reformed, Bad Mr. Frosty is a grouchy snowman who seeks to halt Dr. Kiln's sinister plot, and reclaim the North Pole from Sumo Santa. Frosty battles by transforming his frozen body in various ways, creating snow balls, ice picks, and other such weapons. Frosty tends to punch and kick his opponents by leeringly growling "Call me Daddy!". He's one of the few characters to appear in all of the ClayFighter games, though his appearance has changed greatly in each game. He appears to be a parody of Frosty the Snowman.

Blob

An amorphous green blob with a dopey grin, the Blob may not look like a skilled fighter at first glance. In actuality, Blob is a master of morphing, transforming his body into cannons, sledgehammers, boxing gloves, and many other weapons. Blob also has an appetite for living clay, and thinks nothing of gobbling up a downed opponent for a quick snack. Blob has also been in all three games in the series. In previous games, the Blob had a high-pitched voice and a sadistic grin, but for this outing he's been given a Quasimodo-like voice and a dopey expression.

Bonker

A former children's entertainer, Bonker went insane years ago and now seeks revenge on anybody who laughed at him in his life. With a perpetual scowl on his face and a somber tone of voice, Bonker's homicidal mania belies his flamboyant dress and makeup. Attacking with cream pies, mallets, and a portable cannon, Bonker has many ways to make his enemies suffer. He returns from the first ClayFighter game, with a completely different design: the original Bonker had a manic grin and a cheerfully goofy voice.

Earthworm Jim

The mightiest worm in all creation, Earthworm Jim is vacationing on Claymodo Island when he hears of Doctor Kiln's mad scheme. Never one to let evil have its way, Jim springs into action, showcasing all the head-whipping, raygun-blasting, cow-dropping action his fans love. He's a guest character from his own series of games and Dan Castellaneta reprises his role from the cartoon series. In ClayFighter: Sculptor's Cut, Jim is only playable as a secret character.

Houngan

An evil Jamaican witch doctor and master of voodoo, Happy Harry Houngan has a sinister set of abilities to aid his quest of conquering the world with his black magic. Houngan's main weapon is his rubber chicken, which he has transformed into a zombie. Houngan also sports a juju staff, and a wooden tiki mask to use as a bludgeon (or a snowboard). Some of his attacks cause rotting zombie hands to reach out of the ground and grab his opponent. When he enters the Battle Stage he then rotates his head around which is parodying The Exorcist.

Ickybod Clay

Ickybod Clay is a withered ghoul with a mushy Jack-o'-lantern for a head. Icky resides in his own haunted mansion, although his squeaky voice and rather geeky personality do not make him the terrifying fiend he aspires to be. Among his many attacks, he can throw his own head as a weapon, has a parody of the shoryuken called the Boo-Hoo Ken, and can teleport. He also appeared in the original ClayFighter, but with a more whispery and creepy voice. His name is a parody of Ichabod Crane.

Kung Pow

Rather resembling a bucktoothed Bruce Lee, Kung Pow is a Chinese chef who is also skilled in the martial arts. He wears a white gi, and his dialogue is peppered with bland tidbits of dubious "oriental" wisdom. Most of Kung Pow's attacks are named after Chinese food (like Egg foo young, chop suey, etc.), and he uses utensils such as chopsticks, woks and meat cleavers as weapons. His name is a reference to Kung Pao chicken.

T-Hoppy The Battle Bunny

A cyborg rabbit, T-Hoppy was created as a living weapon by Doctor Kiln (by combining an unexplainably disfigured Hoppy from ClayFighter 2 with mechanical implants) until he rebelled against his creator. Now T-Hoppy fights to destroy Kiln and regain peace of mind. In addition to great physical strength and cybernetic implants, T-Hoppy is also an accomplished stage magician. In ClayFighter 2, Hoppy had an Austrian accent, poking fun at Arnold Schwarzenegger (Even though he didn't have his implants at the time), and the T in his name refers to Schwarzenegger's role as the Terminator, but Adler chose to go with a generic drill sergeant-style voice to fit his new design. Hoppy is also the only new character from ClayFighter 2 to return, as all of the new characters from that game were removed.

Taffy

A former circus freak and partner of Bonker, Taffy is a bizarre creature made entirely out of, fittingly enough, taffy. This gives him incredible flexibility and agility. Taffy also carries gumballs as throwing weapons and carries a pair of six-shooters. He frequently imitates Curly Howard of The Three Stooges, especially Moe's "Oh, a wise guy, eh?" line. This vocal similarity was more noticeable in the original ClayFighter, where Taffy originated.

Unlockable characters
Boogerman

Another hero from previous Interplay games, Boogerman joins the Clayfighters to save the day and show up his old rival Earthworm Jim. Boogerman uses bodily emissions such as mucus, belches, and explosive flatulence against his foes. He can also summon a barrage of falling toilets.

Dr. Kilnklein (often referred to as Dr. Kiln)

Dr. Generic Kiln is the main villain of the piece. After being indirectly responsible for the chaos in ClayFighter 2 (he is mentioned in the ClayFighter 2 manual, but doesn't appear in the game itself), his latest scheme is to transform the entire world into clay, which he can then mold into whatever he wishes. His hand has been replaced with a piece of clay. This new hand can transform into a propeller, a machine gun, a chainsaw, jumper cables, a scalpel, and other dangerous weapons. Meanwhile, his lost hand grew, gained sentience, and became High Five, a hidden character in Sculptor's Cut. With his opaque eyeglasses, hunched back and thick Germanic accent, Dr. Kiln is very much the consummate mad scientist.

Sumo Santa

An evil duplicate of Santa Claus clad in little more than a loincloth. Megalomaniacal Sumo Santa has conquered the North Pole as his own, and only Frosty stands in his way. Grotesquely obese but surprisingly agile, Sumo Santa enjoys using his ponderous girth to smash the competition flat.

Development
ClayFighter 63⅓ was developed by Interplay Entertainment as an entry in its ClayFighter series that originated on the Super NES. The project, under the working title ClayFighter 3, was produced by Jeremy Airey, who had helped create previous titles in the franchise alongside designers Eric Hart and Rodney Relosa. With the ClayFighter series, the development team's goal was to build a legitimate fighting game while comically parodying popular franchises in the same genre such as Street Fighter, Mortal Kombat, and Killer Instinct. Airey explained that this meant replacing the extreme violence from said franchises with either gross or humorous action: "Buckets of blood and gore get boring after awhile. We want to make a game that stays fresh [...] We think this sort of thing works better than gore because each character has something unique and funny to show".

After being dissatisfied with the results of the clay animation in ClayFighter 2, Interplay contacted Danger Productions for the new game's character models and stop motion as it had done on the original ClayFighter. Once the game's characters were sketched out by the artists at Interplay, Danger made the illustrations into maquettes for plastic molds, which were then formed into models with clay, foam, and wire. Interplay directed Danger in filming these figures in various positions with stop motion photography against backlighting. Finally, Interplay digitized the photographs and linked the animation, sound, and player input together with computer scripting tools. These tools had been created during the short production of ClayFighter 2 but had not been fine-tuned until work began on the third entry in the series.

Newer technology allowed Interplay to give the game the aesthetic that they had originally envisioned for the ClayFighter series. Development took place for the 3DO M2, then the Nintendo 64. Airey and the rest of the staff found the N64's software development kit much simpler than that of the M2, though during development Airey expressed regret that the N64 lacked a CD-ROM drive. The N64 allowed the team to render the characters within 3D environments and easily maintain 24-bit color depth. Airey stated that the project team also implemented "Spillits" (bits of clay similar to blood or impact stars in other games) that spill out in all directions in 3D space whenever a character is hit. For the audio in ClayFighter 3, Interplay hired a sound director from Disney when recording the game's character voice-overs from talent including Rob Paulsen, Frank Welker, and Dan Castellaneta, among others. The sound team recorded 30 to 40 different voice lines for each character. The game also features the voice of famous ring announcer Michael Buffer, who provides commentary throughout each round.

Release
ClayFighter 63⅓ was initially announced in the fall of 1995 as a launch game for the upcoming M2 console. By the middle of 1996, the game was still slated as a front-runner in the prospective console's library. In the third quarter of that same year, prior to the M2's eventual cancellation, Interplay announced that production on ClayFighter 3 had shifted to Sony's PlayStation and Nintendo's N64. The game resurfaced under the name ClayFighter Extreme in late 1996; it was then retitled ClayFighter 63⅓ in early 1997 for its imminent release on the N64. The planned PlayStation version of the game was cancelled for being behind its intended release schedule. According to an Interplay representative, this incarnation of the game was cancelled because it was not scheduled for a simultaneous release with ClayFighter 63⅓; the developer did not want PlayStation owners to perceive the game as a mere port of the N64 version.

ClayFighter 63⅓ suffered many delays and was released almost a year after it had previously been scheduled. The magazine Nintendo Power even ran a cover story and an early review of the game in its June 1997 issue. Prior to shipping ClayFighter 63⅓, Interplay altered the combat system, changed many fighters' movesets, and removed five of the original seventeen playable characters from the roster due to space limitations. The game quietly went on sale in North America on October 23, 1997 and in Europe the following month.

ClayFighter: Sculptor's Cut
Interplay later updated ClayFighter 63⅓ with a "special edition" titled ClayFighter: Sculptor's Cut, which was released as a Blockbuster Video rental exclusive in North America on May 15, 1998. Although this version could only be rented and not purchased from the video chain, Blockbuster did give customers the opportunity to win a copy of the game through an online contest. Sculptor's Cut contains new storylines, easier menu navigation, further adjustments to the combat system, a new introduction sequence with vocal lyrics, and other minor changes. Most prominently, Sculptor's Cut re-added four of the five characters that were removed for the game's first release, in addition to the original twelve fighters. The fifth character removed from ClayFighter 63⅓ was Hobo Cop, depicted as a homeless vigilante that consumes alcohol. Hobo Cop was not featured in Sculptor's Cut because Nintendo did not approve of the character.

The following four characters are exclusive to ClayFighter: Sculptor's Cut:
High Five (voiced by Tress MacNeille)

Dr. Kiln's severed hand, mutated by chemicals and transformed into a sentient being. High Five has a deep resentment for his former host, and despite his physical limitations, is a skilled "hand-to-hand combatant". It is unknown whether High Five is a right hand or a left hand, since the fighters are reversed when they cross sides of the screen during gameplay. In terms of gameplay, High Five appears to be unfinished, since he has no ducking Brutal Kick, only one super attack, and no Claytalities.

Lady Liberty (voiced by Tress MacNeille)

The Statue of Liberty transformed by Dr. Kiln into a living clay creature. Like T-Hoppy, Lady Liberty turned on her creator and seeks to destroy him. Lady Liberty's main weapon is her famous torch, which can be used as a flamethrower.

Lockjaw Pooch (voiced by Frank Welker)

Although marked as killed in the production of the original Clayfighter 63⅓ ("This animal was severely injured during the making of this game"), Lockjaw returns to ravage the competition in the Sculptor's Cut. A vicious junkyard dog granted sentience by Dr. Kiln's experiments, the ever-loyal Lockjaw puts his powerful fangs to good use in battle.

Zappa Yow Yow Boyz (voiced by Frank Welker)

Three little pygmy brothers who are the bane of Houngan's existence. Although short and squat, the Boyz are a force to be reckoned with when they climb onto each other's shoulders for battle, as well as summoning their pet goat. The Boyz are cannibalistic, and enjoy tossing defeated opponents into a boiling kettle for dinner.

Reception and legacy

ClayFighter 63⅓ was met with a negative critical reception. The game held an aggregate score of 47.96% on GameRankings based on 13 reviews. While most reviewers found the game's humor and parody to be successful, they also felt its weakness in every other area left it with no long-term appeal. Next Generation, for example, wrote: "What's so likable about Clay Fighter 63 1/3—in fact, about the only thing that's likable—is that it's just so damn silly, and it parodies its targets pretty squarely. Anyone who's played, or even watched someone else play Street Fighter, Mortal Kombat, or Killer Instinct ... will find the characters, their moves, and voice-overs hilarious. ... In the end, most gamers will have a difficult time slapping down $69.99 for this comic-tragic game. How much of a price do you put on a good, if short-lived chuckle?" Critics lambasted the game for using sprite-based graphics, derivative mechanics, weak AI, and choppy animation. GamePro summarized: "Slow action, forced humor, fuzzy speech, frustrating combos, cheesy A.I.—the game's practically a laundry list of What Not To Do Without Good Gameplay."

Matt Casamassina predicted that ClayFighter 63⅓ would "remain a prominent title in the N64 library for years to come" because the game "is so terrible it sets the standards for bad." Contrarily, the editors of Nintendo Power, who reviewed the game in both its unreleased and released forms in June and November 1997 respectively, were much more positive. Sushi-X also defended the game in Electronic Gaming Monthly, arguing that while it is unenjoyable in a traditional fighting game sense, it makes a great party game. His three co-reviewers held closer to the majority opinion, saying the game is funny but would eventually get old.

According to Toy Retail Sales Tracking, ClayFighter 63⅓ sold around 60,000 copies prior to Christmas in 1997. The Sculptor's Cut version of the game remains one of the rarest North American N64 games. It was released as a Blockbuster rental deal and only 20,000 copies were manufactured. Because of this limited distribution and the poor treatment games usually got at video rental stores, boxes and instruction manuals are extremely rare and their value vastly increased in the early 2010s.

In September 2009, Interplay said that they would update the ClayFighter series for the WiiWare and DSiWare services with ClayFighter: Call of Putty. Development was being handled by StudioBlack Games, which included Eric Hart, a programmer on the original ClayFighter. The title of this installment is a parody of Call of Duty, a series of popular first-person shooters. Nintendo Power revealed that Call of Putty would have featured all the gameplay, fighters, and modes available in ClayFighter: Sculptor's Cut and an expected release date in late 2010 or early 2011. However, after continuous delays, the game was listed as TBA release status on Interplay's website.

Interplay commented in 1999 that "Clayfighter broke a million on the Nintendo 64." They did not mention if the Sculptor's Cut edition was part of that figure.

Notes

References

External links
 
 

1997 video games
Cancelled Panasonic M2 games
Cancelled PlayStation (console) games
Christmas video games
Clay animation video games
Crossover fighting games
Fantasy parodies
Interplay Entertainment games
Nintendo 64 games
Nintendo 64-only games
Parody video games
Fighting games
3D fighting games
Video game sequels
Video games with digitized sprites
Multiplayer and single-player video games
Video games developed in the United States